Gary Haulmark (born December 23, 1966) is an American politician who served as a Republican member of the Kansas House of Representatives from 1993 to 1995. He represented the 30th District and lived in Lenexa, Kansas. 

Haulmark was elected in 1992 and was re-elected in 1994. He resigned his seat in spring of 1995 and Richard M. Becker was appointed to replace him.

References

1966 births
Living people
Republican Party members of the Kansas House of Representatives
20th-century American politicians
People from Lenexa, Kansas